Vojňany is a village and municipality in the Kežmarok District, Prešov Region of north Slovakia.

History
In historical records the village was first mentioned in 1235. The historical name of the village in German is Kreig.

Geography
The municipality lies at an altitude of 666 metres and covers an area of 5.795 km². It has a population of about 280 people.

External links
http://vojnany.e-obce.sk

References

Villages and municipalities in Kežmarok District